Agha Hossein Khansari, full name Hossein ibn Jamal al-Din Mohammad Khansari, known as Mohaghegh Khansari and also known as "Master of all in all", who was nicknamed "the disciple of mankind" because of the many masters he acquired knowledge in their presence, was one of the great Iranian jurists of Isfahan jurisprudential school (born in 1607 in Khansar, died in 1687 in Isfahan) in the 11th century AH, who was also engaged in philosophy and wisdom. He was one of the high level scholars during the reign of Sultan Suleiman of the Safavid dynasty and after the death of Mir Seyyed Mohammad Masoom in 1683, he became the Shaykh al-Islām of Isfahan. His children are Jamaluddin Mohammad known as Agha Jamal Khansari and Raziauddin Mohammad known as Agha Razi Khansari.

Life and educations

Agha Hossein Khansari was born on 1607 in Khansar, Iran. Before reaching the age of puberty, Agha Hossein went to Isfahan to study Islamic sciences and studied at Khajeh Molk School of Isfahan Seminary. In Isfahan, he used the presence of many professors and for this reason he called himself "the disciple of mankind" which refers to the multiplicity of his professors.

He studied the rational sciences under the tutelage of Mir Fendereski and the traditional sciences under the tutelage of Mohammad Taghi Majlesi, Khalifeh Soltan, Mohammad Bagher Sabzevari, Heydar Khansari and ... . Agha Hossein Khansari had important permits in review and issuance of Islamic scientific content, including the permission of about 20 pages from Mohammad Taghi Majlesi. Although he was afflicted with poverty during his studies, he eventually reached the point where Shah Suleiman entrusted him with the position of viceroy and overseer on the monarchy and the care of state affairs. He was proficient in rational and traditional sciences and, according to Mirza Abdollah Afandi Isfahani, was a "supporter of the scholars."

From the point of view of others
Ali Khamenei, the current Supreme Leader of Iran, has said about the Khansari family:

Morteza Motahhari, has said about Agha Hossein Khansari:

Political and social activity
Agha Hossein Khansari had a special place in the government of Shah Suleiman, so that when the Shah traveled, he asked Agha Hossein Khansari to run the government affairs as his viceroy; And Agha Hossein Khansari had accepted.

Another prominent feature of Agha Hossein Khansari was his refuge for the poor and helpless, and he made great efforts to meet the needs of the people.

Religious career
Agha Hossein Khansari taught in both the rational and traditional categories and has trained prominent students in the field of Islamic sciences, including:

 Al-Hurr al-Amili
 Nematollah Jazayeri
 Mohammad-Baqer Majlesi
 Mohammad Saleh Hosseini Khatoon Abadi, who studied with him for 20 years.
 Mohammad Bagher Hosseini Khatoon Abadi
 Agha Jamal Khansari, his son.
 Agha Razi Khansari, his other son.
 Sheikh Jafar Qazi
 Mirza Mohammad ibn Hassan Shirvani
 Mullah Mohammad Jafar Sabzevari
 Mohammad ibn Abdolfattah Tonekaboni
 Alireza Shirazi, who was a great poet.
 Mirza Abdollah Afandi

Bibliography
Agha Hossein Khansari was a prolific writer and left many works. His writings can be divided into 3 categories:

Printed works
 Masharegh al-Shomoos fi Sharhe al-Doroos (The Golden Tips in the Explanation of the Doroos): His famous book in Islamic jurisprudence, which is a commentary on the book of Al-Doroos written by Muhammad Jamaluddin al-Makki al-Amili (1334–1385). This book is incomplete and Agha Hossein Khansari has not succeeded in completing the description of the news of The Twelve Imams and the speeches of the Twelver jurists in each topic. Mohammad Bagher Khansari in his book Rawdat Al-Janat has said that this book is unique in terms of the number of researches. This book has been published twice in 1888 and 1893 in Tehran.
 Taligheh bar Hashieh Mohaghegh Sabzevari (Comment on the Hashieh of Mohaghegh Sabzevari): Comment on the book Hashieh of the author Mohammad Bagher Sabzevari, Tehran, 1899
 Al-Resaleh fi Moghadamat al-Vajeb (The message in the introduction to the assignment): Iran, 1899

Manuscripts

 Hashieh Esharat (Comment on the book "Isharat")
 Ensha Darbareye Hormate Sharaab (Essay on the sanctity of wine)
 Hashieh bar Sharhe Tajreede Allame Helli (Comment on the book "Sharhe Tajreed" of Allamah Al-Hilli)
 Hashieh bar Mohakemat (Comment on the book "Mohakemat")
 Hashieh bar Elahiate Shafa (Comment on the book "Elahiate Shafa")
 Ensha dar Tarife Bahar (Essay in the definition of spring)
 Hashieh bar Motavval (Comment on the book "Motavval")
 Hashieh bar Mokhtasar al-Osool (Comment on the book "Mokhtasar al-Osool")
 Resaleh Ejmae (Thesis of Consensus)
 Tarife Sokhan (Definition of speech)
 Shobheye Tafreh (Suspicion of evasion)
 Fayedeh Darbareh Elme Bari Ta'ali (Benefits of the science of transcendence)
 Resaleh dar Khoms (Treatise on Khums)
 Halle Shakk dar Taghseeme Jesm ta Binahaayat (Resolving doubt in the division of the body to infinity)

Attributed works

 Al-Maedeh al-Soleimanieh (Soleimanieh dining): About foods and drinks for Shah Suleiman of the Safavid dynasty.
 Tarjomeye Sahifeh Sajjadieh beh Farsi (Translation of Al-Sahifa al-Sajjadiyya into Persian)
 Resaleh dar Jabr va Ekhtiar (Treatise on Force and Authority)
 Javaher va Aeraz (Essences and Accidents)
 Sharhe Kafieh Ibne Hajeb (Explanation on the book "Kafieh" of Ibne Hajeb)
 Sharhe Hey'at Farsi Qushchi (Explanation on the book "Hey'at" of Qushchi)
 Resaleh dar Shobheh Iman va Kofr (Treatise on Doubt of Faith and Unbelief)
 Resaleh dar Shobheh Estelzam (Treatise on Suspicion of Implication)
 Resaleh dar Tashkik (Treatise on Doubt)
 Tarjomeye Ketabe Nahj ol-Haq Allame Helli beh Farsi Baraye Shah Soleiman Safavi (Translation of Allamah Al-Hilli's book Nahj al-Haq into Persian for the Shah Suleiman of the Safavid dynasty)
 Tafsire Sooreh Fateheh (Interpretation of Surah Al-Fatiha)
 Hashieh bar Sharhe Hekmat al-Eyn (Comment on the book "Sharhe Hekmat al-Eyn")

Demise

He died on 13 May 1687 at the age of eighty-two in Isfahan and was buried in the Takht-e Foulad cemetery, near the tomb of Baba Rokneddin Beyzayi. His sons Agha Jamaluddin and Agha Raziauddin are also buried there, in a tomb named Khansari Mausoleum.

See also
 Mohammad Ibrahim Kalbasi
 Mirza-ye Qomi
 Zakaria ibn Idris Ash'ari Qomi
 Seyyed Mohammad Hojjat Kooh Kamari
 Ahmad ibn Ishaq Ash'ari Qomi
 Zakaria ibn Adam Ash'ari Qomi
 Sayyed Ibrahim Estahbanati
 Aqa Najafi Quchani

References

External links
 Das Grabmal von Agha Hossein Khansari - IranKultur
 Takht-e Foulad - Agha Hossein Khansari mausoleum

1607 births
1687 deaths
Iranian Shia clerics
Iranian Shia scholars of Islam
People from Khansar
17th-century Iranian writers
Burials at Takht-e Foulad
17th-century writers of Safavid Iran